"Only in My Dreams" is a 1986 song by Debbie Gibson.

Only in My Dreams may also refer to:

Songs 
 "Only in My Dreams", a 1959 song by Frank Fafara
 "Only in My Dreams", a 1985 song by Steps from  Greatest Hits
 "Only in My Dreams", a 1994 song by George Ducas from George Ducas
 "Only in My Dreams", a 1996 song by the Tokens from Tonight the Lion Dances
 "Only in My Dreams", a 2004 song by Bon Jovi from 100,000,000 Bon Jovi Fans Can't Be Wrong
 "Only in My Dreams", a 2005 song by Tim Brummett from You Only Live Twice
 "Exit Calypsan (Only in My Dreams)", a 2005 song by Falling Up from Dawn Escapes
 "Only in My Dreams", a 2007 song by Acoustic Alchemy from This Way
 "Only in My Dreams", a 2011 song by Power Quest from Blood Alliance
 "Only in My Dreams", a 2012 song by Ariel Pink's Haunted Graffiti from Mature Themes

Other media 
 Only in My Dreams, a 1997 novel by Kimberly Raye

See also 
 "I'll Be Home for Christmas (If Only in My Dreams)", a 1943 song popularized by Bing Crosby